Naum Sluzsny (1914–1979) was a Swiss-born concert and chamber pianist.

Career
Sluzsny gained a reputation after the Second World War. He was a student of Stefan Askenase and lived and taught in Brussels.

In 1967, he joined the Brussels masonic order "Le Ciment" for which he composed an LP.

He was part of the Trio Reine Elisabeth with the violinist Carlo Van Neste and with cellist Eric Feldbusch.[2]

Selected performances
 On 24 October 1967 in the Town Hall in New York
 On 17 August 1973 in the Casino Kursaal in Ostend.

Selected discography
Le Ciment - Vinyl LP featuring the tracks Entree, Meditation, Tumulte, 1er Voyage: L'Air.
Recital De Piano (1967) 
Chefs-d'Oeuvre Pour Piano (1978) 
6 Preludes Piano (sheet music)

References

Swiss classical pianists
20th-century classical pianists
20th-century classical composers
Swiss classical composers
Swiss male classical composers
Male classical pianists
1914 births
1979 deaths
20th-century male musicians
Swiss emigrants to Belgium
20th-century Swiss composers